Zhanbay Aral, or Dzhambayskiy Island (Janbai araly), is a low, flat island in the Caspian Sea. It is located east of the mouths of the Volga.

Administratively, Zhanbay Island belongs to Atyrau Region of Kazakhstan.

Geography
Zhanbay Island is separated from the Kazakh coast by a 1.2 km wide channel. It has a length of 21.5 km and a maximum width of 7 km.

References

External links
Caspian Sea Biodiversity Project

Islands of the Caspian Sea
Islands of Kazakhstan
Atyrau Region